Sanjarang Bodo School is a primary, upper primary and high school located at Salbari, Baksa, Assam, India. It was established in 2018, and the school management is private unaided. It is a Bodo medium - co-educational school.

Schools in Assam
Educational institutions established in 2018
2018 establishments in Assam
Baksa district